Robert Andrew Senderoff (born July 25, 1973) is the head men's basketball coach at Kent State University. The winningest and longest-tenured coach in program history, he has led the Flashes to a Mid-American Conference regular season title as well as NCAA Tournament appearances in 2017 and 2023.

Personal and early life 
Senderoff is a native of Spring Valley, New York.  He played basketball for his high school team.  He earned a bachelor's degree in business administration from University at Albany in 1995, and was also a student assistant with the basketball program.

He then moved on to Miami University, where he was a graduate assistant and earned a master's degree in sports studies in 1997. He is married to Lauren (née Edelstein), with a son and daughter, Ray and Samantha. He is Jewish, and is a member of Temple Beth Shalom in Hudson, Ohio, and lives in Stow, Ohio.

Coaching career
Senderoff served as an assistant coach at Fordham University (1997–99), Yale University (1999–2001), and Towson University (2001–02), and as a graduate assistant at Miami University.

Senderoff had two stints with the Kent State program before moving into the head job. First, he was an assistant to coach Jim Christian from 2002–06. Then, he was hired by former head coach Geno Ford to be his associate head coach.

Senderoff was then hired by Kelvin Sampson to be an assistant for two seasons at Indiana. Sampson and Senderoff resigned in October 2007 in the midst of a recruiting controversy. The NCAA eventually handed Senderoff a 30-month show-cause penalty for his role in the scandal. Unlike the vast majority of coaches given such a penalty, he retained a coaching job during it.

He was hired by Kent State as an assistant coach in April 2008.  In September 2010, The Hoop Scoop rated him as the fourth-best Mid-Major assistant basketball coach in the nation.

He was hired as the 24th head coach in the 95-year history of Kent State basketball on April 7, 2011, to replace Geno Ford, under whom Senderoff had served as associate head coach for the previous three seasons. His contract called for three years at $250,000 per year, with built-in bonuses for meeting incentives. In May 2015, Kent State extended his contract by five years, with compensation of an estimated $350,000 per year.

Senderoff led the Golden Flashes to their first MAC Tournament Championship and NCAA Tournament appearance in eight years in 2017, but lost to UCLA in the first round. Following their NCAA Tournament appearance, Kent State would extend Senderoff's contract an additional two years.

On Dec. 28, 2018, Senderoff won his 149th career game, passing Jim McDonald for the most in Kent State history. The Flashes made their fourth CIT appearance under Senderoff later that season before going 15–8 two years later, their second-best season winning percentage (.652) of Senderoff's tenure. New athletic director Randale L. Richmond subsequently rewarded the coach with another extension through 2026.

During the 2021–22 season, Senderoff led the team to a 12-game winning streak to conclude the regular season, the longest winning streak at Kent State since the 2002. He was named MAC Coach of the Year for the first time in March 2022, the ninth time a KSU head coach had won the award. Despite posting the best record of his career at 23–11, KSU lost to Akron in the MAC Tournament finals before falling to Northern Arizona in the first round of the inaugural edition of The Basketball Classic.

Head coaching record

References

External links

 Statistics at College Basketball-Reference.com
 Kent State bio

1973 births
Living people
American men's basketball coaches
Jewish American sportspeople
Jewish men's basketball players
Basketball coaches from New York (state)
Fordham Rams men's basketball coaches
Indiana Hoosiers men's basketball coaches
Kent State Golden Flashes men's basketball coaches
Miami University alumni
NCAA sanctions
People from Spring Valley, New York
People from Stow, Ohio
Sportspeople from the New York metropolitan area
Towson Tigers men's basketball coaches
Yale Bulldogs men's basketball coaches
University at Albany, SUNY alumni
21st-century American Jews